Nikita Aleksandrovich Burmistrov (born 6 July 1989) is a Russian footballer who plays as a right winger for PFC Sochi. He also played as a left winger and centre-forward.

Career

Club career
In February 2010, Burmistrov moved from CSKA Moscow to Amkar Perm. In September 2012, Burmistrov moved from Amkar Perm to Anzhi Makhachkala, before moving back to Amkar on loan till the end of the 2012–13 season in January 2013. Upon the conclusion of the 2012-13 season, Amkar and Anzhi agreed to extend the loan deal for the 2013–14, however after Anzhi sold the majority of their star players in a "change of direction" for the development of the club, Burmistrov returned to Anzhi in August 2013.

In June 2014, Burmistrov left Anzhi, moving to FC Krasnodar on a three-year contract.

Career statistics

References

1989 births
People from Primorsk, Kaliningrad Oblast
Sportspeople from Kaliningrad Oblast
Living people
Russian footballers
Russia youth international footballers
Russia under-21 international footballers
Russia national football B team footballers
Association football midfielders
PFC CSKA Moscow players
FC Luch Vladivostok players
FC Shinnik Yaroslavl players
FC Amkar Perm players
FC Anzhi Makhachkala players
FC Krasnodar players
FC Tom Tomsk players
FC Ural Yekaterinburg players
FC Arsenal Tula players
FC Baltika Kaliningrad players
FC Rotor Volgograd players
PFC Sochi players
Russian Premier League players
Russian First League players